Phoinix may refer to:

 In mythology, any of the uses of Phoenix, including several heroes and the mythical bird
 Phoinix (Caria), a town of ancient Caria, now in Turkey
 Phoinix (Crete), a town of ancient Crete mentioned in the Bible
 Phoinix (Lycia), a town of ancient Lycia, now in Turkey
 4543 Phoinix, a minor planet